is a former Japanese football player. He is the younger brother of singer Masashi Sada.

References

1954 births
Living people
Japanese footballers
Expatriate footballers in Hong Kong
Japanese expatriates in Hong Kong

Association football forwards